A chart is a graphical representation of data.

Chart or CHART may also refer to:

 A specific type of map, for example: 
 Aeronautical chart, a representation of airspace and ground features relevant to aviation
 Nautical chart, a representation of a maritime area and adjacent coastal regions
 Chart, in computer science, a data structure used by a chart parser to store partial hypothesized results for re-use 
 Chart (magazine), a Canadian music publication
 Chart, in geometry or topology, a coordinate chart for a manifold
 CHART (Chaperone-Advanced Replacement Therapy), a medical treatment
 CHART (Coordinated Highways Action Response Team), part of the Maryland State Highway Administration
 Chart of accounts, an accounting term
 Chart Records, a record label
 Chord chart, a form of sheet music
 Medical record, a medical file
 Project CHART, a digital history project in Brooklyn, New York
 Record chart, for music popularity rankings

See also

Charl (name)
Charo (disambiguation)
Charter
Charting (disambiguation)
Chartres